Bridgeland is a surname. Notable people with the surname include:

Eric Bridgeland, basketball coach
John Bridgeland, United States activist working in White House and Congress
Samuel Bridgeland (1847–1903), Canadian physician and politician
Tom Bridgeland (born 1973), British mathematician